Pedro Elías Pablo Montt Montt (29 June 1849, Santiago, Chile – 16 August 1910, Bremen, Germany) was a Chilean political figure. He served as the president of Chile from 1906 to his death from a probable stroke in 1910. His government furthered railroad and manufacturing activities but ignored pressing social and labour problems.

Biography
The son of the former Chilean president Manuel Montt Torres and Rosario Montt Goyenechea, Pedro Montt graduated in law from the National Institute in 1870. He was elected a member of the Chamber of Deputies in 1876 and became its president in 1885. Montt held two posts in the cabinet of President José Manuel Balmaceda, but in 1891 he took an active part in the revolution that overthrew Balmaceda. He then went to the United States, first as an agent of the revolutionary junta and later (after U.S. recognition) as Minister.

Unsuccessful in his first bid for the presidency in 1901, Montt was elected by a large majority in 1906 as the candidate of the National Union ticket. His first action was to call out the army to suppress large-scale strikes in 1907, which resulted in the Santa María School massacre. His administration supported the construction of a railway that ran the length of the country and stimulated the production of nitrates and copper. It did little, however, to improve the living conditions of the people. In 1909, then-child-prodigy pianist Claudio Arrau played for Montt, who was so taken by the performance that he authorized a ten-year grant from the Chilean government for Arrau to study in Europe. In 1910, Montt left Chile for medical treatment in Germany, but died before he could return to Chile.

See also
Montt family

References

External links
Short biography  
Genealogical chart of Montt family 

1849 births
1910 deaths
People from Santiago
Chilean people of Catalan descent
Pedro Montt
National Party (Chile, 1857) politicians
Presidents of Chile
Chilean Ministers of Public Works
Chilean Ministers of Finance
Chilean Ministers of the Interior
Presidents of the Chamber of Deputies of Chile
Deputies of the XIX Legislative Period of the National Congress of Chile
Deputies of the XX Legislative Period of the National Congress of Chile
Deputies of the XXI Legislative Period of the National Congress of Chile
Deputies of the XXII Legislative Period of the National Congress of Chile
Deputies of the XXIII Legislative Period of the National Congress of Chile
Deputies of the XXIV Legislative Period of the National Congress of Chile
Deputies of the XXV Legislative Period of the National Congress of Chile
Senators of the XXVI Legislative Period of the National Congress of Chile
Senators of the XXVII Legislative Period of the National Congress of Chile
Senators of the XXVIII Legislative Period of the National Congress of Chile
Candidates for President of Chile
Chilean Freemasons
Instituto Nacional General José Miguel Carrera alumni
University of Chile alumni
Children of presidents of Chile